Kakuji Inagawa (稲川 角二 Inagawa Kakuji), also known as Seijō Inagawa (稲川 聖城 Inagawa Seijō; November 1914 – December 22, 2007) was a Japanese yakuza boss best known for founding the Inagawa-kai, Japan's third-largest yakuza syndicate.

Inagawa, son of a Meiji University graduate who fell on hard times, never attended school.  He was recruited into the yakuza as an enforcer when he was a teenage judo student.

After serving in World War II, Inagawa formed the Inagawa-gumi, the predecessor to the current Inagawa-kai, in Atami, Shizuoka in 1949.

Inagawa was regarded as an "elder statesman" of the yakuza, and a peacemaker skilled in settling disputes between rival gangs. In the early 1960s, he headed the short-lived Kanto-kai, a federation of Kantō region gangs organized by Yoshio Kodama.  That organization's rightist philosophy was summed up by Inagawa:  "We bakuto cannot walk in broad daylight," he said.  "But if we unite and form a wall to stop Communism, we can be of service to our nation."

References

Yakuza members
People from Yokohama
Japanese crime bosses
1914 births
2007 deaths